The karuka (Pandanus julianettii, also called karuka nut and Pandanus nut) is a species of tree in the family Pandanaceae and an important regional food crop in New Guinea.  The nuts are more nutritious than coconuts, and are so popular that villagers in the highlands will move their entire households closer to trees for the harvest season.

Names
The specific epithet "julianettii" honors naturalist Amedeo Giulianetti, who found the original type specimens.

 is a loanword from Tok Pisin.  Sometimes the tree is called '' or 'karuka nut pandanus'.  The term 'karuka' can apply to both Pandanus julianettii and P. brosimos, though the latter is usually called 'wild karuka'.  Both species, as well as P. dubius, can be called 'pandanus nut'.  In addition to P. brosimos, 'wild karuka' can also refer to P. antaresensis, P. iwen, and P. limbatus, but nuts from these trees are a much smaller part of the local diet.  In contexts where multiple karuka species are discussed, P. julianettii is sometimes termed 'planted karuka'.  P. julianettii, P. iwen, and P. brosimos are also in the subsection named Karuka, which is in the monotypic section also named Karuka.

In New Guinea it goes by different names among each of the Papuan peoples. In Kewa language it is aga, but it is unclear which dialect(s). In the Kewa pandanus language it is rumala agaa. The plant is called  in the Wiru language. In the Pole language it's called maisene.

The plant also has many names on the other half of the island. The Dani people call it  tuke. The Lani people call it , but this might be a separate species in the complex.

Description
The species was originally described by Ugolino Martelli from only a few drupes in the collections of the Royal Botanic Gardens, Kew  He was hesitant to describe it as a new species from only that, but the characteristics were so salient he published his description.

The tree is dioecious (individual plants either have male flowers or female ones), with male trees uncommon compared to females. The trunk has white mottling and is generally smooth with occasional warts or small knobs as well as rings of leaf scars. Inside the trunk is pithy and lacking cambium. The top of the tree sometimes branches, producing three or four crowns of leaves. Each crown will produce a single cluster of nuts, typically once every other season. Production is affected by the seasonality of local rainfall.

Leaves spiral up the trunk in opposite pairs. The apex of the leaf is attenuate and doubly-pleated, with prickles pointing up at the tip and along the margins and midrib. The leaves are dark green on top and dull cyan underneath.

The inflorescence on male trees is a densely-branched spadix with a dozen long spikes, each containing many staminate phalanges. In each phalange is a column 3 mm long topped by up to 9 subsessile anthers.

The pollen has a psilate exine (unornamented outer wall) 0.8 μm thick.  The ornamentation is granular between echinae (short spines).  The ulcerate aperture is 3 μm in diameter.  Pollen grains measure an average of 30 × 14.5 μm in size.

On female trees, the inflorescence is a single ellipsoid or ovoid syncarp, or fruiting head, with off-white bracts.  Female flowers can produce fruit without pollination, and are typically the only trees cultivated.  The tree stops making leaves when new fruit is growing.  The syncarp has up to a thousand densely-packed single-celled carpels that later turn into drupes.

The clavate, pentagonal drupes measure up to 12 cm long and have a sharpened base, but typically are 9×1.5 cm, and are a pale blue-green color.  Each cluster contains about 1000 nuts.  The endocarp is bony and thin, 5½ cm long, with rounded edges about 1½ cm wide.  The seed-bearing locule is around 4 cm long.  The core of the mature head (mesocarp) has an appearance like honeycomb and is spongy and pink.  The top of the mesocarp is fibrous, from 3 cm long and up.  Though Martelli did not have a complete syncarp, he knew the cluster of fruit must be large, estimating at least 30 cm in diameter.  He was correct, as the fruiting cluster is typically 15 to 30 cm in diameter.  A mature head and stalk weigh up to 16 kg, but average 6 kg.

It most closely resembles P. utilissimus, which is found the Philippines.  People also harvest and eat nuts of P. antaresensis, P. brosimos, P. dubius, P. iwen, and P. limbatus, and P. odoratissima

Cultivars
There are up to 45 cultivars of karuka, many with different kernel shapes.  There are likely many more, as some are known only to a small number of people in a single settlement.  'Tabuna' and 'Henga' are some of the most important.  'Tabuna' is popular because it is high-yielding, tastes good, and has no taboos on who/what can eat it and how/if it is cooked.  At least two varieties are edible raw.

Named varieties include:

 
 
 
 
 
 
 
 Goalia
 Gurubu
 Hagidara
 
 
 Henga
 Homagal-iba
 
 Honde
 
 
 
 Kabali
 
 Kai
 
 
 Kebali
 
 
 
 
 
 Mabu
 
 
 
 
 
 
 Ngaule
 
 
 
 Padua
 Pari
 
 
 
 
 
 
 
 Tabuna
 
 
 
 Tenyon
 
 
 Tolo
 
 
 Tumbi
 Tumbu
 

It is possible a cultivar is listed more than once under different names, as Papua New Guinea has a very high linguistic diversity.

Benjamin Clemens Stone posits that P. julianettii and P. brosimos are a single species with many varieties, but does not support this point.  However, Simon G. Haberle notes that the pollen of the two trees are indistinguishable by light microscopy.  P. iwen may also be part of the species complex.

Distribution
Giulianetti's type specimens were collected from Vanapa, British New Guinea (now southern Papua New Guinea).  The tree can be found cultivated or wild on New Guinea, both in PNG and Papua province.  Wild trees are found on the Huon Peninsula and in the highlands of New Guinea's central cordillera.  In Papua New Guinea, the tree is most commonly grown in Southern Highlands, Western Highlands, Eastern Highlands, Enga, and Chimbu Provinces, and it is found in all provinces on the mainland except East Sepik.  It grows in montane forests between 1,300 and 3,300 m in elevation in areas that get 2–5 m mean annual precipitation.  It grows in both dry and wet soils, but prefers good soil fertility.  Trees will grow in clumped groups of 5 to 10 individuals per hectare.

Ecology
Karuka produces fruit around February, with an occasional secondary season in July.  Typically each branch will only flower every other year.  The natural pollination syndrome is unknown, but the flowers can be pollinated by humans.  Seed dispersal is by humans, birds, and other animals.  According to the Kalam people of Madang Province, the Lorentz's mosaic-tailed rat (Paramelomys lorentzii) helps spread karuka seeds.  A fallen syncarp will disintegrate completely in about 3 days in the forest.

Fungal pests of karuka include leaf spot, diffuse leaf spot, black leaf mould (Lembosia pandani), sooty mold (Meliola juttingii), and fungus on seeds (Macrophoma pandani).  The leaf moulds do not do much damage.  The sooty mould seems to grow on insect frass.  The black leaf mold only affects some varieties.

The bacteria Pectobacterium carotovorum subsp. carotovorum can also cause bacterial soft rot and necrosis on the leaves, but causes more severe damage to the related species Pandanus conoideus.

Longhorn grasshoppers (Tettigoniidae) are serious insect pests.  Segestes gracilis and Segestidea montana eat the leaves and can sometimes kill trees.  Growers will stuff leaves and grass in between the leaves of the crown to keep insects out.  An unknown species of black grub will burrow into the cluster and eat the spongy core, causing the nuts to turn black and the whole bunch to fall off the tree.  Woodboring beetles sometimes attack the prop root of the tree.

Possums also eat the nuts, as do rodents such as squirrel-toothed rats (Anisomys imitator), eastern white-eared giant rats (Hyomys goliath), Rothschild's woolly rats (Mallomys rothschildi), and giant naked-tailed rats (Uromys anak).  Growers will put platforms or other obstacles on the trunks of trees to keep the pests out.

Harvested nuts are often beset by rats and cockroaches.  Hanging nuts in the smoky areas above fires can prevent this, but after a while the taste of the nuts is affected.

Use by humans
On New Guinea karuka is cultivated crop, and has been used as a major food source since nearly 31,000 years ago in the Pleistocene.  In PNG nearly 2 million people (almost half the rural population) live in regions where karuka is commonly eaten.  There is high demand for it in the New Guinea Highlands:  Entire households (including pigs, who are sometimes fed the fruits) will move from the valleys to higher elevations at harvest time, often for several weeks.  Each household will average 12 to 176 trees.

Trade in karuka is small-scale and not commercial.  Local marketplaces typically will have 12 to 50 fruits for sale.  With some coordination between state agencies and private sector, karuka could have export market access. The crop has a medium potential for large-scale sustainable commercialization in the region, but care must be taken in the sensitive local environments to expanded agriculture.  Diets of tree owners could also be negatively influenced by rapid commercialization.

The endosperm, a white kernel, is eaten raw, roasted, smoked, or mumued.  Nuts that aren't immediately eaten are typically sun-dried for storage.  The karuka kernels have a sweet, coconut taste, or savory and like walnuts.  Smoked or cooked karuka is either stored in the rafters or sold at local marketplaces.  The uncooked clusters can also be stored for months buried in waterlogged earth, which possibly ferments it.  It is a regional staple food and one of the few plants in the area with a high protein content.  The spongy core of the multiple fruit cluster can also be cooked and eaten after the nuts are removed.

The high fat content means the nuts can be processed into an edible yellow oil.   Karuka contains 52.39% oleic acid, 44.90% palmitic acid, and 0.19% stearic acid.  The oil is a good source of Vitamin E (α-tocopherol 5.03 mg/100 g).  The color of the oil is from the carotenoids, which are at a concentration of 2.75 µg/g.  The antioxidant activity for the oil is fairly low, and it is higher in saturated than unsaturated fats.

Some subjective reports indicate that children are healthier after karuka season, but there may also be increased incidence of tropical ulcers and pig-bel (caused by Clostridium perfringens).  But the connections, if any, are unclear.

Trunks and buttress roots are used for building.  The sheets of bark are used for house walls.  The leaves are used for bush shelters and raincapes.  The leaves were the preferred building material for housing in Papua New Guinea before  colonial contact.  The durable white spathe leaves on male inflorescences are used by the Wola people to wrap pearl shells.

Karuka can be cultivated by cutting a mature branch and replanting it (vegetative propagation).  Suckers can also be replanted.  Nurseries also plant seeds directly.  New nuts will grow when a tree is at least five or six years old, and can keep producing for up to fifty years.  The tree can tolerate temperatures down to 3 °C for extended periods and 0 °C for short periods.  The USDA hardiness is 10–12, and is hardy to zone 10 in the UK system.

In Upper Karint near Pingirip, karukas are planted as boundary lines between garden plots.

In culture
In PNG's Central Province Premier Rugby League the team for Goilala District is called the Karukas.

See also
 Domesticated plants and animals of Austronesia
 Pandanus languages

References

Pandanus
Plants described in 1907
Trees of New Guinea
Edible nuts and seeds
Fruits originating in Asia
Tropical fruit
Tropical agriculture
Non-timber forest products
Papua New Guinean cuisine